The 1996–97 Santos Laguna season was the 9th season in the football club's history. Santos competed in Primera División and Copa México, winning the Verano 1996 tournament, their first league title ever.

Coaching staff

Players

Squad information

Players and squad numbers last updated on 31 January 2019.Note: Flags indicate national team as has been defined under FIFA eligibility rules. Players may hold more than one non-FIFA nationality.

Competitions

Overview

Torneo Invierno

League table

Results summary

Torneo Verano

League table

Results summary

Statistics

Goals

Hat-tricks

Own goals

Clean sheets

References

Santos Laguna seasons
1996–97 Mexican Primera División season
1996–97 in Mexican football